Joseon was a Korean kingdom between 1392 and 1897.

Joseon, Josŏn, Chosŏn, Choseon or Chosun may also refer to several places:

 Korea, also referred to as Joseon
 Gojoseon, ancient Korean kingdom, which existed until 108 BCE
 North Korea, which refers to itself (and Korea as a whole) as Joseon
 Koreans in China, a minority people in China who came from the Korean peninsula

See also
 Names of Korea
 The Chosun Ilbo, a South Korean newspaper
TV Chosun, a South Korean pay television network and broadcasting company under Chosun Ilbo
 Choson Sinbo, a pro-North Korean Japanese newspaper
 Chosun University, a South Korean university